Kenneth Robert Hamilton Deane (1921-1997) was a male swimmer who competed for England.

Swimming career
Deane represented England in the freestyle events at the 1938 British Empire Games in Sydney, New South Wales, Australia.

Personal life
During the Games in 1938 he lived at Surbiton Lodge, High Street, Gorleston-on-Sea, Norfolk and was a student. His training schedule during the winter included a daily 100 mile round trip because the nearest swimming pool was in Ipswich, the Norwich pool was only open during the summer months.

References

1921 births
1997 deaths
English male swimmers
Swimmers at the 1938 British Empire Games
Commonwealth Games competitors for England